Max Wilhelm Theodore Reischle (18 June 1858 – 11 December 1905) was an Austrian-born German Protestant systematic theologian. He was born in Vienna, and died in Tübingen.

In 1887, he received his doctorate at the University of Tübingen, later working as a professor at the Karlsgymnasium in Stuttgart (from 1889). In 1892, he was appointed a full professor of practical theology at the University of Giessen, then become a professor of systematic theology at the University of Göttingen (1895). During the following year, he accepted a call to Halle as chair of systematic theology.

His studies largely dealt with mysticism in theology, the philosophy of religion and the transmission of ethical principles in academic instruction.

Published works 
 Die Frage nach dem Wesen der Religion. Grundlagen zu einer Methodologie der theologischen Wissenschaft (1889) – The question of the nature of religion. Foundations for a methodology of theological science. 
 Der Glaube an Jesus Christus und die geschichtliche Erforschung seines Lebens (1893) – Faith in Jesus Christ and the historical study of his life.
 Christentum und Entwicklungsgedanke (1898).
 Christliche Glaubenslehre in Leitsätzen für eine akademische Vorlesung entwickelt (1899) – Christian doctrine as guidelines for academic lecture development.
 Werturteile und Glaubensurteile (1900) – Value and belief judgments.
 Die Bibel und das christliche Volksleben (1902).

References

External links 
 Max Reischle at www.catalogus-professorum-halensis.de (German language)

Austrian Protestant theologians
German people of Austrian descent
Writers from Vienna
Academic staff of the University of Göttingen
Academic staff of the University of Giessen
Academic staff of the University of Halle
University of Tübingen alumni
1858 births
1905 deaths
19th-century German Protestant theologians
19th-century German male writers
German male non-fiction writers